"I Promise to Wait My Love" is a 1968 single recorded by girl group Martha and the Vandellas (credited as Martha Reeves & the Vandellas), released on the Gordy label.

Background
The third release from the group's Ridin' High, it was another single given to them by producer Richard Morris. Produced under a Memphis soul sound similar to soul singer Aretha Franklin, the song has the narrator (lead singer Martha Reeves) promising to wait for her love as he fights in Vietnam, although the song does not overtly reference the war, disguising it as the war being another woman saying that she will love him "even though (he does her) wrong".

Personnel
Lead vocals by Martha Reeves
Background vocals by Rosalind Ashford and Lois Reeves
Produced by Richard Morris
Instrumentation by The Funk Brothers

Chart performance
"I Promise to Wait My Love" peaked at #62 on the Hot 100. The song also went to #36 on the Hot Rhythm & Blues Singles chart.

References

1968 songs
1968 singles
Martha and the Vandellas songs
Songs written by Sylvia Moy
Gordy Records singles
Songs written by George Gordy